Jūratė Ščerbinskaitė (born November 15 1994) is a Lithuanian swimmer, who specialized in long-length freestyle events. She is a multiple-time national records holder.

Career
Ščerbinskaitė participated in 2010 Summer Youth Olympics. She represented Lithuania at the 2013 World Aquatics Championships. In 200 metre freestyle she finished 32nd and failed to qualify for the semifinals.

References

1994 births
Living people
Lithuanian female freestyle swimmers
Swimmers at the 2010 Summer Youth Olympics
People educated at Plymouth College
Sportspeople from Kaunas